Shirdel Sadak (also Romanized as Shīrdel Sādak; also known as Deh-e Shīrdel, Shāh Moḩammad, and Shīrdel) is a village in Margan Rural District, in the Central District of Hirmand County, Sistan and Baluchestan Province, Iran. At the 2006 census, its population was 130, in 32 families.

References 

Populated places in Hirmand County